Anna Hopkin  (born 24 April 1996) is a British swimmer. She won gold as part of the British team at the 2020 Tokyo Olympics in mixed 4 × 100 metre medley relay, setting a new world record time.

Career
Hopkin, who is from Chorley, competed for England in the women's 4 × 100 metre freestyle relay at the 2018 Commonwealth Games, winning a bronze medal.

In May 2021, at the European Championships held in Budapest, Hopkin won gold medals in women's 4 × 100 metre freestyle, women's 4 × 100 metre medley, mixed 4 × 100 metre freestyle and mixed 4 × 100 metre medley relays.

Hopkin was named as a member of the British team to go to the postponed 2020 Olympics in Tokyo. This would be her first Olympics and she joined as part of what was considered a "high quality" swimming team. Hopkin swam the anchor freestyle leg in the Mixed 4 x 100 metre medley relay,  and won gold in a new world record time of 3 minutes 37.58 seconds together with Adam Peaty, James Guy and Kathleen Dawson.

Hopkin was appointed Member of the Order of the British Empire (MBE) in the 2022 New Year Honours for services to swimming.

References

External links
 
 
 

1996 births
Living people
English female swimmers
English female freestyle swimmers
Swimmers at the 2018 Commonwealth Games
Swimmers at the 2022 Commonwealth Games
Commonwealth Games medallists in swimming
Commonwealth Games silver medallists for England
Commonwealth Games bronze medallists for England
Team Bath swimmers
Medalists at the FINA World Swimming Championships (25 m)
European Aquatics Championships medalists in swimming
Sportspeople from Chorley
Olympic swimmers of Great Britain
Swimmers at the 2020 Summer Olympics
Medalists at the 2020 Summer Olympics
Olympic gold medalists in swimming
Olympic gold medallists for Great Britain
Arkansas Razorbacks women's swimmers
Members of the Order of the British Empire
Medallists at the 2018 Commonwealth Games
Medallists at the 2022 Commonwealth Games